Harry Edgar Goldsworthy (October 5, 1883 – March 5, 1970) was an American college football player and coach. He served as the head football coach at State Normal School at Cheney–now known as Eastern Washington University–for one season, in 1909, compiling a record of 0–2.

Head coaching record

References

1883 births
1970 deaths
Eastern Washington Eagles athletic directors
Eastern Washington Eagles football coaches
Washington State Cougars football players
People from Whitman County, Washington